Belén is a canton in the Heredia province of Costa Rica. The head city is in San Antonio district.

History 
Belén was created on 8 June 1907 by decree 15.

Geography 
Belén has an area of  km² and a mean elevation of  metres.

The area is well known locally for its inland chalk cliffs.

Districts 
The canton of Belén is subdivided into the following districts:
 San Antonio
 Rivera
 La Asunción

Demographics 

For the 2011 census, Belén had a population of  inhabitants.

Transportation 
The compact canton is on the western side of the General Cañas Highway midway between the national capital city of San José and the Juan Santamaría International Airport.

Road transportation 
The canton is covered by the following road routes:

Rail transportation 
The Interurbano Line operated by Incofer goes through this canton.

Education

The American International School of Costa Rica is located in Cariari, La Asunción District, Belén.

References 

Cantons of Heredia Province
Populated places in Heredia Province